John Moore (born 1 October 1966) is an English-born Hong Kong international footballer. A striker, Moore has played professionally in England, Wales, the Netherlands and Hong Kong.

Career
Born in Stanley, Moore began his career with Sunderland in 1984. While at Sunderland, Moore spent loan spells at St Patrick's Athletic, Newport County, Darlington, Mansfield Town and Rochdale. Moore then played in the Football League for Hull City and Sheffield United before moving to the Netherlands to play with FC Utrecht.

After a year abroad, Moore returned to England, playing with Shrewsbury Town, Crewe Alexandra and Scarborough. Moore then played non-league football with Bishop Auckland, before moving to Hong Kong, where he played with Sing Tao, Happy Valley and Sun Hei. 

He then returned to England after ten years in Hong Kong to play with Durham City.

International career

Having played within the Hong Kong divisions for at least seven years, Moore obtained permanent residential status in which he was eligible to represent the national team in 1999 and participated in the 2002 FIFA World Cup qualifying campaigns with Hong Kong.

References

1966 births
Living people
Sportspeople from Consett
Footballers from County Durham
English footballers
Hong Kong footballers
Hong Kong international footballers
Association football forwards
Sunderland A.F.C. players
St Patrick's Athletic F.C. players
Newport County A.F.C. players
Darlington F.C. players
Mansfield Town F.C. players
Rochdale A.F.C. players
Hull City A.F.C. players
Sheffield United F.C. players
FC Utrecht players
Shrewsbury Town F.C. players
Crewe Alexandra F.C. players
Scarborough F.C. players
Bishop Auckland F.C. players
Sing Tao SC players
Happy Valley AA players
Sun Hei SC players
Durham City A.F.C. players
Eredivisie players
English Football League players
League of Ireland players
Expatriate footballers in Hong Kong
Naturalized footballers of Hong Kong
English emigrants to Hong Kong
English expatriate footballers
English expatriate sportspeople in the Netherlands
Expatriate footballers in the Netherlands
Expatriate association footballers in the Republic of Ireland
Hong Kong League XI representative players